Brickellia rhomboidea is a Mexican species of flowering plants in the family Asteraceae. It is native to the state of Sonora in northwestern Mexico, found along the shores of the Gulf of California including on offshore islands.

Brickellia rhomboidea is a loosely branching shrub up to 150 cm (5 feet) tall.

References

rhomboidea
Flora of Sonora
Plants described in 1890